Saint-Thibault is a commune in the Côte-d'Or department in France.

Its population is 162 (2018). The river Armançon and the Canal de Bourgogne pass through the commune.

The parish church, Église Saint-Thibault, dates from the 13th-17th century. The church was part of the Priory of Saint-Thibault, that once held the relics of Saint Theobald of Provins.

Population

See also
Communes of the Côte-d'Or department

References

Communes of Côte-d'Or